is a Japanese manga written by Yōzaburō Kanari and illustrated by Kuroko Yabuguchi. The manga was serialized in Shueisha's Weekly Young Jump and collected in nine tankōbon volumes. The series was licensed in North America by Viz Media.

Plot
Kohei Nagase is a prodigy special effects artist. He and his friend Shingo Kannazuki, a gifted stuntman, form a special effects company called 'Studio Gimmick'. They do freelance work for various Japanese studios. Often Kohei's makeup skills and Shingo's fighting strength are called in to fight crime. For example, in their first story, the pair help rescue a struggling actress from her manipulative, abusive manager. Another incident involves Kohei creating fake scars so as to confuse and distract evil people.

Manga
Gimmick! is written by Yōzaburō Kanari and illustrated by Kuroko Yabuguchi. The manga was serialized in Shueisha's Weekly Young Jump and collected in nine tankōbon by Shueisha, released between September 16, 2005 and May 18, 2007. The series is licensed in North America by Viz Media, with nine tankōbon volumes released between June 10, 2008 and October 13, 2009. The manga is also licensed in Taiwan by Ever Glory Publishing.

Volume list
Each chapter is called a "scene".

Reception
Phil Guie of Pop Culture Shock commends the illustrator for capturing the protagonist's "childlike enthusiasm for old monster movies perfectly with lots of full-page panels" and comments that "the creative team also seems to understand that a hero is only as good as his nemesis". Sam Kusek from Pop Culture Shock commends the manga for making "a very nice reference to The Sound of Music". Manga Life's Barb Lien-Cooper criticises the manga for using movie special effects that "don't translate onto paper". About.com's Deb Aoki commends the manga for featuring "a high-spirited, smart and likeable hero with an unusual profession" but she also criticises the manga for minimal character development and "one-dimensional villains". Comics Worth Reading's Johanna Draper Carlson comments that "the transformation process is a chance for dramatic art. It's treated intensely, as though it were life-saving surgery, but with the elements and techniques explained to the reader, providing a mini-course in movie makeup". A later review by Carlson comments that "many of Kohei's effects serve no purpose in the bigger story beyond entertaining the reader". Active Anime's Davey C. Jones comments that the manga "keeps the action hoppin' and the mysteries boppin'!" Coolstreak Comics' Leroy Douresseaux comments that the "action can get pretty intense at times, but never more than anything one would find in a PG-13-rated movie". Douresseaux compares Gimmick! to Case Closed and MacGyver. A later review by Douresseaux comments on "the stories [which] are full of tidbits on special makeup effects and animatronics, the kind of technical details that give stories realism and also intrigue readers". Jason Thompson's appendix to Manga: The Complete Guide commends the manga for its "basic shonen story structure with the mysterious mentor and the 'ambitious, hardworking person who is ridiculously good at some skill/job/ability'". He also comments on the manga's "cinematic leanings are so distinctly Hollywood-focused, which is questionable in one sense (it'd be nice to know more about the history of Japanese special effects), but on the other sense, makes it easy for a Western reader to follow". Manga Life's Ysabet Reinhardt MacFarlane appreciated the "real-world references" in the manga "primarily to director Sam Raimi's work".

References

External links

2005 manga
Mystery anime and manga
Seinen manga
Shueisha manga
Thriller anime and manga
Viz Media manga
2007 comics endings